The 2017 Asian Acrobatic Gymnastics Championships were the 10th edition of the Asian Acrobatic Gymnastics Championships, and were held in Almaty, Kazakhstan from September 17 to 19, 2017.

Medal summary

Medal table

References

A
Asian Gymnastics Championships
International gymnastics competitions hosted by Kazakhstan
2017 in Kazakhstani sport
September 2017 sports events in Kazakhstan